<noinclude>
Liepājas tramvajs is a municipal company that operates a single tram line in Liepāja, Latvia.

History

1899 

The first electric tram line in the Baltic states was founded in Liepāja, September 26, 1899. The first nine trams used by the company were made by Herbrand (based in Köln, Germany). The first tram line was built to Karosta.

1903 
In 1903 the company ordered six new trams from Herbrand. The new trams received numbers 10 to 16.

1904 
Two-way tram line has been built at Liela street in the city center.

1940 
After World War II the old Herbrand trams has been placed to new self-made frames. 18 March 1941 for the first time since 1899 the woman (Anna Cekuse) has become the conductor. The company starts to use tree-digit numbering, precessing tram number with 1. In 1949-1956 few trams has been built in Liepāja using the details from Kaliningrad and self-made frames.

1957 

In 1957 Liepājas tramvajs has received 8 Gotha T57 trams with numbers 125–132.

1960 

Liepāja has received 10 new trams Gotha Т59Е with the numbers 139–148 in 1961. In 1962 has been bought 8 new Tatra T2-62 with numbers 149–156.

1970 
In 1974 Liepājas tramvajs has transported 12 million passengers per year.

1990 
New tram-stops with add stands has been built in Liepāja by EuroAWK

2007 
In Liepāja widely discussed plans to extend the tram line to the Ezerkrasts district.
The company starts to offer new service — payments for the tram tickets by mean of SMS. This service was developed in cooperation with Riga company Citycredit.

2013 
the tram line to the Ezerkrasts district is made

2018 
In 2018, 12 KONCAR NT2300 low-floor trams were ordered, with first delivery happening in November 2020, and one KONCAR NT2300 trams should be on Liepāja's streets by the end of 2020.

October 2020 
The first KONCAR NT2300 low-floor tram is being tested in Zagreb's streets, 2 Liepaja's tram drivers and 2 technicians drive to Zagreb, to learn how to drive KONCAR NT2300 tram, also a plan has been made to extend tram line to go to k-senukai market, to go through Laumas district and go to Karostas bridge.

10 November 2020 
The |KONCAR NT2300 delivery has been started to Liepāja, it will go through other countries to Germany by land, then it will be loaded onto a ship and delivered to Liepāja by ship. This is the first Croatian tram to be delivered to another country also the first new Liepāja tram has been numbered as ''250'' which means the other 13 trams will receive numbers from 251 to 262.

17 November 2020 
The first KONCAR NT2300 has been delivered to Liepāja and put into Liepaja's tram rails, the old trams are numbered to 247, the number 248 will be given to the "snow white" track cleaner and number 249 will be given to a technical tram when it is purchased in future, also there is a discussion to buy two more trams, so Liepāja will have 14 new trams in total, also the two new tram should come to Liepāja at January 2021 but the first six should all be delivered by May 2021, the new trams are not expected to drive through Liepaja's streets till 2021, when the second KONCAR NT2300 will be delivered to Liepaja.

18 February 2021 
The second and third KONCAR NT2300 have been delivered to Liepaja, however as of 18 February, Liepaja's tram drivers have started to train on how to drive KONCAR NT2300 trams. The new trams are expected to be in service sometime in March.

18 March 2021 

The KONCAR NT2300 trams enter service during Liepaja's 396th birthday, currently all 6 KONCAR NT2300s are in service

21 November 2022 
The last model of KONCAR NT2300 was brought to Liepāja, but now have 14 trams.

Fleet

The current fleet consists of five Tatra KT4SU trams that were newly delivered, eleven type KT4D trams formerly in service in Cottbus, Gera and Erfurt, six KONCAR NT2300's, two of them are in service and a tram track cleaner called 'Snow White', which was built around the 1920s and rebuilt in 1954, and is the only tram from that time which is still in operating condition. This tram fleet is currently the oldest tram fleet in the Baltics.

Tickets & price

Gallery

References

External links

 
Unofficial website 
gallery of Liepāja's tram  

Liepāja
Transport in Liepāja
Tram transport in Latvia
Metre gauge railways in Latvia